Triamcinolone hexacetonide (brand name Aristospan; also known as triamcinolone acetonide 21-tebutate) is a synthetic glucocorticoid corticosteroid.

References

Acetonides
Secondary alcohols
Corticosteroid esters
Fluoroarenes
Glucocorticoids
Pregnanes
Diketones